This article show all participating team squads at the 2003 Pan American Games, played by eight countries held from August 1 to August 17, 2003 in Santo Domingo, Dominican Republic.

Head Coach:

Head Coach: Luis Felipe Calderón

Head Coach: Jorge Garbey

Head Coach: Carlos Aparicio

Head Coach: Mike Hebert

References

NORCECA
GRANMA

P
Volleyball at the 2003 Pan American Games
2003 in women's volleyball
Vol